Noam Sohlberg (born 22 January 1962) is an Israeli jurist who serves as a judge on the Supreme Court of Israel.

Early life
Sohlberg was born and raised in Haifa. His parents, Shaul and Yehudit Sohlberg, were Jewish immigrants from the Netherlands. He attended a religious high school in Haifa, and studied at Yeshivat Har Etzion in Alon Shvut. He did his mandatory military service in the Israeli Air Force, and completed his service with the rank of Major.

Legal career

After his military service, Sohlberg studied law at the Hebrew University of Jerusalem, during which he served as a teaching and research assistant at the Hebrew University Faculty of Law and as counsel in the Israeli National Council for the Promotion of the Rule of Law and Democracy. He graduated with an LLB in 1990, and completed a two-year internship in the civil law department in the State Attorney's Office, Supreme Court, and Attorney General's Office between 1990 and 1991. He was admitted to the Israel Bar Association in 1991, and served as a legal assistant to Attorney General Yosef Harish from 1991 to 1993, then as a prosecutor at the State Attorney's Office from 1993 to 1994, before serving as a senior legal assistant to Attorneys General Michael Ben-Yair and Elyakim Rubinstein between 1994 and 1998. He was also a lecturer at the Bar-Ilan University Faculty of Law from 1996 to 1999.
 
In 1998, he completed an LLM at the Hebrew University of Jerusalem, and was appointed a judge on the Jerusalem Magistrate's Court. He became a judge on the Jerusalem District Court in 2005, and was appointed a judge on the Supreme Court in 2012. He began serving on the Supreme Court on 21 February 2012. According to the Supreme Court's seniority system, he is expected to serve as President of the Supreme Court from 2028 to 2032.

Personal life
Sohlberg lives in Alon Shvut, an Israeli settlement in the West Bank. He is married to Meira, with whom he had five daughters. His daughter Hadas suffered from Rett syndrome, and died in 2018 at age 33.

References

1962 births
Living people
Israeli Orthodox Jews
Judges of the Supreme Court of Israel
Israeli people of Dutch-Jewish descent
Yeshivat Har Etzion